This is a list of Italian films first released in 2012 (see 2012 in film).

See also
2012 in Italy
2012 in Italian television

External links
Italian films of 2012 at the Internet Movie Database

2012
Films
Italian